Piet is a masculine given name derived from Petrus. It is a common Dutch and South African names, the latter because of Dutch emigration. Notable people with the name include:

Piet Bergveld (born 1940), Dutch electrical engineer
Piet Bleeker (1928–2018), Dutch long-distance runner
Piet de Boer (1919–1984), Dutch footballer
Piet Botha (1955–2019), South African musician
Piet Cronjé (1836–1911), South African general in the Anglo-Boer wars
Piet Dankert (1934–2003), Dutch politician and President of the European Parliament (1982–1984)
Piet Hein Donner (born 1948), Dutch politician and cabinet minister
Piet Hartman (1922–2021), Dutch crystallographer
Piet Hein (scientist) (1905–1996), Danish scientist, mathematician, inventor, designer, author, and poet
Piet Hoekstra (born 1947), Dutch cyclist
Piet Pieterszoon Hein (1577–1629), Dutch naval officer
Piet Huyg (1951–2019), Dutch footballer
Piet de Jong (1915–2016), Prime Minister of the Netherlands (1967–1971)
Piet Joubert (1834–1900), Commandant-General of the South African Republic from 1880 to 1900
Piet Keizer (1943–2017), Dutch footballer
Piet Kleine (born 1951), Dutch speed skater, Olympic gold and silver medalist
Piet Koornhof (1925–2007), South African politician and cabinet minister
Piet Kramer (1881–1961), Dutch architect
Piet Kruiver (1938–1989), Dutch footballer
Piet Kuiper (born 1934), Dutch botanist
Piet Meiring, South African theologian
Piet Mondrian (1872–1944), Dutch painter
Piet Retief (1780–1838), Boer leader
Piet Roozenburg (1924–2003), world draughts champion (1948–1954)
Piet Schrijvers (born 1946), Dutch football goalkeeper
Piet Uys (1797–1838), Boer leader
Piet de Visser (football manager) (born 1934), Dutch football manager
Piet de Visser (politician) (1931–2012), Dutch politician
Piet de Wit (born 1946), Dutch cyclist
Piet de Wolf (1921–2013), Dutch footballer

See also
Zwarte Piet ("Black Pete"), the companion of Saint Nicholas in the folklore of the Low Countries

Dutch masculine given names